The Saxon Peasants was a political party in Weimar Germany.

History
The party first contested national elections in 1928, winning two seats in the federal elections. However, the party did not contest the next elections in 1930.

References

Defunct regional parties in Germany
Agrarian parties in Germany